Vincenzo Grassi (born 17 November 1938) is a retired Italian freestyle wrestler. He competed at the 1964, 1968 and 1972 Olympics with the best result of fifth place in 1968. He finished in fourth place at the 1962 World Championships and at the 1970 and 1972 European Championships.

References

External links
 

1938 births
Living people
Olympic wrestlers of Italy
Wrestlers at the 1964 Summer Olympics
Wrestlers at the 1968 Summer Olympics
Wrestlers at the 1972 Summer Olympics
Italian male sport wrestlers
20th-century Italian people
21st-century Italian people